State Route 207 (SR 207), named Mount Reba Road along its entire length, is a state highway in the U.S. state of California that serves as a spur route from State Route 4 near the community of Bear Valley in Alpine County to Mount Reba and the Bear Valley Mountain Ski Resort.

Route description
The route begins at State Route 4 as a two-lane road, and heads north to its northern terminus at Mount Reba, where it expands to make way for the Bear Valley Mountain Ski Resort parking lot. Because SR 207 is the only way to access the ski resort, the state highway has more traffic during winter than when it is not snowing in the mountains. The route totals about a mile. After its intersection with SR 207, SR 4 quickly becomes a one-lane highway as it heads east to Ebbetts Pass. Winter traffic to SR 207 and the ski resort may be further exacerbated due to the fact that the segment of SR 4 through Ebbetts Pass typically closes during the winter months.

SR 207 is not part of the National Highway System, a network of highways that are considered essential to the country's economy, defense, and mobility by the Federal Highway Administration.

Major intersections

See also

References

External links

California @ AARoads.com - State Route 207
Caltrans: Route 207 highway conditions
California Highways: SR 207

207
State Route 207